
Żyrardów County is a unit of territorial administration and local government (powiat) in Masovian Voivodeship, east-central Poland. It came into being on 1 January 1999, as a result of the Polish local government reforms passed in 1998.

As of 2019 its total population is 75,787, out of which the population of Żyrardów is 39,896, that of Mszczonów is 6,376, and the rural population is 29,515.

Neighbouring counties
Żyrardów County is bordered by Grodzisk Mazowiecki County to the east, Grójec County to the south-east, Rawa County to the south, Skierniewice County to the west and Sochaczew County to the north-west.

Administrative division
The county is subdivided into five gminas (one urban, one urban-rural and three rural). These are listed in the following table, in descending order of population.

References

 
Land counties of Masovian Voivodeship